John Edward Kingsley Mann (July 27, 1919 – July 11, 1980) was a Canadian professional ice hockey player who played nine games in the National Hockey League. Born in Winnipeg, Manitoba, he played with the New York Rangers.

External links

References 

1919 births
1980 deaths
Canadian expatriate ice hockey players in the United States
Canadian ice hockey centres
Fresno Falcons players
New York Rangers players
New York Rovers players
New Westminster Royals (WHL) players
St. James Canadians players
Ice hockey people from Winnipeg
Winnipeg Rangers players